Potamia ( meaning rivers) is a village in the municipal unit of Falaisia, Arcadia, Greece. In 2011 Potamia had a population of 118. Every year in August the Parrasia folklore festival is organised in Potamia.

Population

See also
List of settlements in Arcadia

References

External links
History and Information about Potamia
 Potamia GTP Travel Pages

Falaisia
Populated places in Arcadia, Peloponnese